Sugar Ray Leonard vs. Thomas Hearns II, billed as The War, was a professional boxing match contested on June 12, 1989, for the WBC and WBO super middleweight titles. The fight ended in a split draw, meaning both fighters retained their respective titles.

Background
In January 1989, promoter Bob Arum announced the long-awaited rematch between reigning WBC super middleweight monarch "Sugar" Ray Leonard and reigning WBO super middleweight champion Thomas Hearns. The two fighters had met previously nearly 8 years before with Leonard rallying in the 14th round to defeat Hearns by technical knockout after trailing on all three of the judge's scorecards. Both Leonard and Hearns had become five-division champions in their previous fights with Leonard capturing both the WBC light heavyweight and super middleweight after defeating Donny Lalonde on November 7, 1988, while Hearns had won the WBO super middleweight only three days before, after earning a close majority decision against James Kinchen. Leonard then vacated his light heavyweight title, deciding to stay in the super middleweight division. Leonard and Hearns agreed to fight at a catch-weight of 164 pounds rather than the 168-pound super middleweight limit. A $500,000 per pound fine was to be paid by one fighter to the other should either come into the fight above the catch-weight, though this turned out to not be an issue as Leonard weighed 160 pounds and Hearns came into the fight at 162.

On the day of the fight, Hearns' younger brother Henry was arrested for the shooting death of his girlfriend at a house Thomas owned in Detroit.  
 Promoter Bob Arum went to the hotel Hearns was staying at to check on him and told the press "Tommy was angry at me for coming by and he said to me: This is not going to affect me. Look, I’m here to do a job--I’ve been waiting eight years to knock this guy out."

The fight
In a hard-fought bout, Leonard and Hearns would go the full 12-round distance and ultimately fight to a split draw as one judge (Jerry Roth) scored the fight 113–112 for Hearns, another (Tom Kaczmarek) scored the fight the same albeit in Leonard's  favor and the third (Dalby Shirley) had the fight even at 112–112. The draw was controversial as most who watched the match, including the television announcers had Hearns winning by enough to be surprised by the official scoring. The ringside crowd loudly protested the decision. Hearns scored the only two knockdowns of the fight, dropping Leonard in the third after grazing him with a right cross that caused Leonard to lose his footing and again in round 11 after landing consecutive right hands. Though Leonard did not score a knockdown over Hearns, he would have a big round five, winning the round 10–8 on all three scorecards after dominating Hearns throughout the round. Leonard would also win the 12th and final round on all three scorecards as well, though Judge Shirley would give Leonard a 10–8 round as opposed to the other two judges who scored it 10–9; had Shirley scored the round 10–9, Hearns would have been declared the winner by split decision. Both fighters, however, accepted the decision with Leonard stating "I think we both showed we're champions. I accept the decision." and Hearns declaring, "I respect their decision. I'm proud I had a draw. The judges could have ruled that I lost. So I'm thankful for what I have."

Fight card

References

1989 in boxing
Boxing in Las Vegas
Boxing on HBO
Hearns II
Caesars Palace
June 1989 sports events in the United States